Reflections on a Crime (also known as Reflections in the Dark) is a 1994 American prison thriller written and directed by Jon Purdy. Mimi Rogers stars as a woman in the final hours of  Death Row retelling the murder of her husband that she was incarcerated for.

Plot
Regina, a death row prisoner, raises questions about her guilt when she recalls the murder of her husband, James, through a series of confessions and flashbacks. Colin, a prison guard, with a media interest, is intrigued by the beautiful Regina and her story. Colin questions Regina about her late husband's murder and receives conflicting answers, raising questions over the cause of James' death and whether or not Regina had intended to kill him. It also becomes clear to Colin that, during James and Regina's marriage, the former became possessive and abusive, struggling to deal with an earlier relationship of Regina's that she could not forget.

Cast
Mimi Rogers as Regina
Billy Zane as Colin
John Terry as James
Kurt Fuller as Howard
Lee Garlington as Tina
Nancy Fish as Ellen
Frank Birney as Doctor

Reception
New York Magazine praised Rogers' "typically terrific performance" in the film. Rogers also won the Best Actress prize for the film at the Seattle International Film Festival, with the Seattle Times praising her  "strong" performance.

References

External links
 

1994 crime thriller films
1994 independent films
1990s prison films
American crime thriller films
American independent films
American prison films
Films about capital punishment
Women in prison films
1994 films
1990s English-language films
1990s American films